Francis Irsch (December 4, 1840 in Landkreis Trier-Saarburg, Rhineland-Palatinate, Germany – August 19, 1906 in Tampa, Florida, USA) was an American soldier who fought in the American Civil War. He was held prisoner of war by the Confederate States Army until his release on March 1, 1865.

In May 1892, Irsch received the Medal of Honor for his actions at the Battle of Gettysburg on July 1, 1863, including "gallantry in flanking the enemy and capturing a number of prisoners and in holding a part of the town against heavy odds while the Army was rallying on Cemetery Hill".

See also
 List of Medal of Honor recipients for the Gettysburg Campaign
 List of foreign-born Medal of Honor recipients

External links

References

1840 births
1906 deaths
American Civil War recipients of the Medal of Honor
Military personnel from Rhineland-Palatinate
United States Army Medal of Honor recipients
German emigrants to the United States
Union Army officers